Radulphus de Canaberiis or Raoul de Chenevières (c.1240-1297) was a French nobleman, teacher of Roman law in Orléans (France).

Canaberiis was born in the Île-de-France. During the early years of his career, he taught at Orléans and served as an official of the bishop. On 18 December 1291 he was appointed Canon in the  Cathedral of the Holy Cross of Orléans.

References

External links 
www.bbkl.de

13th-century French people
1297 deaths